Mylikouri is a small village in the Nicosia District of Cyprus, located just south of Kykkos Monastery.

References

Communities in Nicosia District